The ninth and final season of Ang Probinsyano began airing on August 23, 2021 and ended on August 12, 2022 on Kapamilya Channel and Cine Mo! (on cable and satellite TV providers) and through a block-time agreement with A2Z (on analog free TV in Metro Manila only and digital TV nationwide) and TV5 (on nationwide free TV stations). It is also available on-demand via iWantTFC. The series stars Coco Martin as P/Maj. Ricardo Dalisay, together with an ensemble cast, following the celebration of 6th anniversary on air. This is also part of the 7th anniversary for the final weeks of airing.The ninth season of Ang Probinsyano focuses on Cardo and the Task Force Agila hiding in the North, President Oscar Hidalgo going on the run with the help of his two friends to warn Cardo, Armando's plan to kill the kingpin responsible for the massacre of his fellow farmers, the Black Ops deal with the high-value targets under the supervision of Arturo Padua and Lily Hidalgo,Lito's illegal drug transactions, Renato's hunger for power, and Lily's plan to bring down Renato for the next election. And in the finale the conclusive and epic battle of Cardo and the Task Force Agila against Renato, Arturo, Lily and their powerful army of evil minions to avenge all the victims of their horrific barbarities and put an end to their oppressive and dictatorial regime.

Plot
Cardo Dalisay and Task Force Agila have found their hiding place in the North, while their oppressive and totalitarian enemies, First Lady Lily Hidalgo, Secretary Arturo Padua, Defense Secretary Renato Hipolito, the Black Ops led by Albert de Vela and drug lord Lito Valmoria, are still hunting for them. Having recovered from the induced coma caused by Lily, Oscar escapes from the palace, along with his close friends, housemaid Elizabeth and PSG member Ambo, to warn Cardo of their evil intentions while both Lily and Renato separately deploy their respective men to find Oscar. Oscar is replaced by an ignorant decoy Mariano. Albert and the Black Ops, under the supervision of Arturo, focus on dealing with the high-value targets until Padua runs out of patience when Albert fails to catch Cardo. Albert later allies with Lito to work together for hunting and assasinating drug competitors. Renato plans to allow the international drug syndicate to operate in the country if he becomes the president, while Lily also plans bring Renato down for the next election,Both two opposing wicked politicians engage in a power struggle to regain back the country and put it into an era of totalitarian rule.

Armando, his wife Lolita, and daughter Mara plan to kill the powerful business and political kingpin Don Ignacio Guillermo, who perpetrated the killing of farmers to claim Armando's land. Eventually, Cardo and Agila are eventually found by the local police at Las Casas Filipinas de Acuzar, leading to the ensuing shootout. Armando and his group cross paths with Cardo during the chaos at Hotel de Oriente and they form an alliance after they seemingly killed Don Ignacio. However, Armando has malevolent intentions against the Agila merely for the bounty. Don Ignacio survives the firefight by Mara but was placed in critical condition, leading to the arrival of Oscar's first love Aurora from the United States. Meanwhile, Don Ignacio's estranged brother Eduardo is only interested in taking the family's wealth after hearing his brother's condition.

It is later revealed that Mara is in fact Aurora's and Oscar's biological daughter; she is unaware of the fact that she was used and trained by Armando and Lolita to kill her biological grandfather Don Ignacio as revenge for the death of their biological child at the hands of Don Ignacio. Armando and Lolita decide to kill Mara to tie loose ends. The couple plans to neutralize Agila for the bounty but Agila escapes with the help of Lucas, Armando's mercenary member, but not before Delfin is left behind and is then mercilessly tortured.

After a violent confrontation between Renato, Arturo, and Lily, Cardo is injured and is brought to the hospital by the Black Ops to keep him alive under orders from Lily. Lito plans to kill Cardo personally, and after a brutal cat-and-mouse fight, Cardo emerges victorious and kills Lito, thus avenging Alyana's death and this makes Lily enraged. Meanwhile, Agila eventually finds the real Oscar and decides to return to Armando's mansion to rescue Delfin. After days of recovering from his injuries at Ramona's camp, Cardo returns to Armando's lair, where he learns of the latter's true colors. A bloodied Delfin sacrifices himself to allow Cardo to buy some time to attack Armando's men, but Armando and Lolita eventually escape from Agila's attack. Their mansion was later burned down by Cardo and his group. The couple subsequently makes watertight their alliances with the despotic Lily.

Oscar and Senate President Camilo Edades decide to unmask Lily, Renato, and Arturo's crimes, corruptions, and atrocities to the public. This allows him to return to power and reinstate Agila back into the police force and clearing the false allegations and the terror-tagging against them because everything is a lie and those false charges are perpetrated by Renato, Arturo, and Lily and he discloses the fact that Cardo's team will put an end to their terroristic and bloody dictatorship. Defeated and branded as enemies of the people, Lily, Albert, Armando, and Lolita hatch a plan in attempt to make their last stand and launch a counterrevolution against Agila, also to provoke a civil war by hiding in a secluded manor "Tierra Del Diablo" so they could commence the nightmarish war and to regain back the country under her absolute power, while Renato forges an alliance with a ruthless warlord named Lucio Santanar, who was also a former member of Pulang Araw and work together also to put the country into an era of totalitarian terror. Later that time Renato, Lily, and Arturo became warlords in order to put the country under their totalitarian and absolute state elite rule and in so doing although they are ousted from power they start to commit a wave of violent purges. Soon thereafter, Lucio and his paramilitary death squads launch a series of bombings of hospitals and schools, even launching a killing spree against innocent civilians, healthcare workers, teachers and students. When Arturo arrogantly refuses to ally with Lucio, Renato betrays him by killing Arturo with one push of a button for a bomb to detonate before winning Lucio's trust. On the other hand, Lily sets up a video call to talk to her foreign allies about their instigation of a bloody war and to sequester the country itself. She ruthlessly massacres the partygoers of the manor while they are having fun, and then betrays her foreign allies by gunning them down after they learn of her sinister agenda as they attempt to defect. Agila's first mission is to capture Lily, Albert, Armando, Lolita, Renato and their hordes of thugs and goons and to punish and execute them for their crimes against humanity and abuse of power either dead or alive, concluding with Agila's victory when they wiped out all of them. Now, Agila prepares for a final yet deadly showdown against their last remaining enemies Renato, Eduardo, and Lucio. James, Dante, and Marsial were all murdered by Lucio's lackeys. Victor was assasinated by Renato after murdering Eduardo by stoning him to death who tried to rape Roxanne, with Roxanne being murdered shortly thereafter. Jerome and Rigor, dressed and disguised by Lucio's group as their own, were killed in friendly fire by Ramil and Patrick. During Cardo's bloody duel with Lucio, he reveals his sinister secret that he created the bombs that Homer used back then to kill Cardo's son. Cardo then finishes off Lucio by decapitating him with a sword that was given by Ramona to him. Meanwhile, Renato and his men are still standing strong, and they go on to finish off the remaining members of the Agila. Diana, Greco, Billy, Ramil, and Patrick all sacrifice their lives to allow Cardo and Oscar to escape. Cardo diverts Renato and his men to buy Oscar some time to escape, but Oscar decides to help Cardo. Unfortunately for Cardo, he gets shot multiple times by Renato. While Renato celebrates and prepares to finally finish off Cardo, Oscar manages to kill him and his men before backup arrives, avenging the fallen members of Task Force Agila and resulting in a pyrrhic victory thus putting an end to Renato's diabolical reign of fear even his worst yet horrifying deeds. With the total and victorious defeat and the deaths of Lily, Arturo, Renato and the rest of their subordinates, justice is totally served for all the victims of their oppressive and despotic rule. The reign of terror, greed, corruption, injustice, and anarchy finally comes to an end. Oscar then mourns and honors the members of Task Force Agila for their bravery and their heroic sacrifices in saving the country from the fiendish rule of tyrants and murderers like the likes of Renato, Arturo, and Lily by giving them a solemn vigil, state funeral, and a Catholic memorial service. Eventually, Cardo gets promoted to Police Major by Oscar for his bravery and forewarning him that dictators and tyrants like Renato and Lily attempting to enslave and degrade the country continually and assures him to assume his role in heading again the aims of the Task Force Agila,but he changed his mind and Oscar lets him go to live a free life and hoping him all the best. After reuniting with his family and mourning Lola Flora's death, he decides to stay with them in Botolan. Cardo then narrates that good and justice will always win and also evil and injustice will not win, also to continue his selfless pursuit for social justice and to defend the cause of the weak and the oppressed but until then his work is still not done because he dreams of a better world where there will be no more evil, tyranny, corruption, greed, and violence and total liberation from the rule of tyrants and murderers. After the state funeral and state interment for Task Force Agila, Oscar later marries his first love, Aurora, effectively making her the new First Lady of the Philippines. Unbeknownst to the two of them, while Cardo was off to work, he suddenly spots their daughter Mara, who is alive. The two of them smiled and greeted one another, hinting the start of a relationship between them but all was well.

Cast and characters

Main cast
 Coco Martin as P/Maj. Ricardo "Cardo" Dalisay
 Julia Montes as Mara Silang / Maria Isabel G. Hidalgo
 Rowell Santiago as President Oscar Hidalgo and Mariano Patag
 John Arcilla as Renato "Buwitre" Hipolito
 Lorna Tolentino as former First Lady Lily Ann Cortez-Hidalgo
 Ara Mina as Ellen Padua
 Geoff Eigenmann as P/Maj. Albert de Vela
 Jaime Fabregas as P/LtGen. Delfin S. Borja
 Angel Aquino as BGen. Diana T. Olegario
 John Prats as P/Cpt. Jerome Girona, Jr.
 Michael de Mesa as Pat. Ramil "Manager" D. Taduran
 Raymart Santiago as P/Maj. Victor A. Basco
 Shaina Magdayao as P/Maj. Roxanne Opeña
 Richard Gutierrez as Angelito "Lito" Valmoria
 Joseph Marco as Lucas Catapang
 Tirso Cruz III as Judge Arturo "Art" M. Padua
 Marc Abaya as Jacob Serrano
 John Estrada as Armando Silang
 Rosanna Roces as Lolita Silang
 Tommy Abuel as Don Ignacio Guillermo
 Sharon Cuneta as First Lady Aurora Guillermo-Hidalgo
 Charo Santos-Concio as Ramona
 Susan Roces† as Flora "Lola Flora" S. Borja-de Leon

Supporting cast
 Malou Crisologo as Yolanda "Yolly" Capuyao-Santos
 John Medina as P/Cpt. Avel "Billy" M. Guzman
 Marc Solis as P/MSgt. Rigor Soriano
 Bryan "Smugglaz" Lao as Pat. Marsial "Butete" Matero
 Lordivino "Bassilyo" Ignacio as Pat. Dante "Bulate" Villafuerte
 CJ Ramos as Pat. Patrick Espinosa
 Sancho delas Alas as Pat. Gregorio "Greco" Cortez
 Jay Gonzaga as James Cordero
 Nonong Ballinan as Ambo
 Whitney Tyson as Elizabeth
 Julian Roxas as Julian
 Vangie Labalan as Lucia Dueñas
 Michael Flores as Samuel Catapang
 Chai Fonacier as Cheche
 Elora Españo as Aira 
 Rani Caldoza as Remy
 Rogerson Jimenez Pulido as Atty. Fred Santillan
 Nixon Mañalac as RJ
 Ruben "Kidlat" Pedrosa as Sebastian/Ka Bastian
 Paul Ryan Aquino as Paeng
 Roi Vinzon as Eduardo Guillermo
 Tanie Capiral as Ditas
 George de Lumen as Mr. Babas
 Jared Gillett as William Calloway
 Resa Toledo as Ressa
 Alianna Duran as Delia
 Imee Casañas as Aimee Cruz
 Lally Buendia as Malacañang reporter
 Chase Romero as P/Lt. Castro
 MJ Reyes as P/Lt. Ramos
 Dax Augustus as Augustus
 Danny Ramos as Winston Cabral
 Val Iglesias as Turo
 Elaine Ochoa as P/Cpt. Victoria "Vicky" Cruz
 Paolo Paraiso as P/Cpt. David Alcantara
 Mark McMachon as P/Cpt. Cris Fabia
 Marela Torre as Thalia Gonzales
 Maika Rivera as Cassandra Jose
 Noel Colet as Acting President Camilo Edades
 Jerome Ponce as P/Cpt. Adrian Jimenez
 Jimboy Martin as P/Cpt. Jerry Abalos
 John Wayne Sace as Omar Cuevas
 Richard Arellano as Alfonso/Ponso
 Jonar Del Rosario as Bunye
 Erlinda Villalobos as Consuelo
 Michael Brian as Ka Berto
 Raymond Bagatsing as Lucio Santanar
 Karl Medina as Kidlat

Episodes

<onlyinclude>

 

 

</table>
</onlyinclude>

Notes

References

External links

2021 Philippine television seasons
2022 Philippine television seasons